CSV BOL is a football club from Broek op Langedijk, Netherlands. Its first team plays in the Saturday Eerste Klasse since summer 2018.

History

20th century 
The Christelijke Sport Vereniging Broek op Langedijk (CSV BOL) was founded on 26 July 1949. It won a its first and only section championship in the Vierde Klasse in 1967, the first year it played it in the main KNVB leagues.

21st century 
In 2011, BOL won its first championship in the Derde Klasse. BOL has been playing since 2013 in the Tweede Klasse as well as in the season 2011–12. In the intermediate season, 2012–13, Pieter-Bas den Hartigh scored 51 goals for CSV BOL, obtaining a split first place on the top scorer list of North Holland. It finished that year section champion in the Derde Klasse.

BOL has won section championships in the Tweede Klasse in 2017 and 2018. In the season 2018–19 it played for the very first time in the Eerste Klasse. On 1 September 2018 BOL won the Sauerkraut Cup (Zuurkoolcup) for a second consecutive year.

References 

Association football clubs established in 1949
1949 establishments in the Netherlands
Football clubs in the Netherlands
Football clubs in North Holland
Sport in Dijk en Waard